Princess Cut is a 2015 American Christian romance film, directed and written by Paul Munger.

Plot
A lifelong Carolina farm girl who's saving her first kiss for the wedding, now in her early 20s, Grace has dreamed all her life of the day when "Mr. Right" slips a Princess Cut diamond on her finger and swears to love her forever. Tonight may be that night as Stewart has something special planned after 15 months together! But when things don't go as planned, and romance crashes down around her, it launches her on a quest, aided by her father, to understand what it means to truly love another person. Will Grace finally discover love or ruin her chances for happiness forever?

Cast
Ashley Bratcher as Grace Anderson
Joseph Gray as Clint Masters
Rusty Martin Sr. as  Jim Anderson
Mimi Sagadin as Katherine Anderson
Rusty Martin as Robert Anderson
Evan Brinkman as Drew Anderson

Accolades

References

External links

Christian Film Database

2015 films
2015 romance films
Religious romance films
2010s English-language films